Don't Ever Change may refer to:
"Don't Ever Change" (House episode)
"Don't Ever Change" (song), a 1961 song written by Gerry Goffin and Carole King
"Don't Ever Change" (song), a song by The Kinks on their 1965 album Kinda Kinks